Sambou is both a surname and a given name. Notable people with the name include:

People with the surname
Bassala Sambou (born 1997), English footballer
Djibril Sambou, Senegalese judoka
Emil Sambou (born 1994), Gambian footballer
Gregory Sambou (born 1994), Gambian footballer
Isabelle Sambou (born 1980), Senegalese sport wrestler
Kaba Sambou (born 1996), Gambian footballer
Massamba Sambou (born 1986), Senegalese footballer
Pape Landing Sambou (born 1987), Senegalese footballer
Youba Sambou (born 1944), Senegalese politician

People with the given name
Sambou Sissoko (born 1999), French footballer
Sambou Traoré (born 1979), Malian-French basketball player
Sambou Yatabaré (born 1989), Malian footballer